Antonio Piccolo (born 18 July 1990) is an Italian footballer.

Biography

Youth career
Born in Pomigliano d'Arco, Campania region, Piccolo was signed by Northern Italy club Torino F.C. at young age. He was the backup of Lys Gomis in 2007–08 reserve league. In 2008, Piccolo was signed by city rival Juventus F.C. He compete with Carlo Pinsoglio for the first choice in the first half of the reserve league, which Piccolo played in round 2, 4, 7, 9, 12 and round 20. In the second half of season Timothy Nocchi became the second keeper with two appearances. In June 2009 Piccolo was lent to Juventus Berretti U18 team, or the B team of the reserve, for the playoffs round. The Old Lady was beaten by A.C. Milan in the final (1–2) of the wildcard group, however Juventus only used two "more mature" players Piccolo and Alessio Curcio in the starting line-up, and most of its original Berretti team, however Milan used majority of its A.C. Milan Primavera (despite not all of the regular starter) and some Berretti players. Pinsoglio continued to play as the first choice in 2009–10 reserve league.

Milazzo
After without a club for 6 months, Piccolo was signed by S.S. Milazzo in January 2011.

International career
Piccolo capped once for Italy national under-20 football team in December after finished as the runner-up of Berretti League in June 2009. He also became the backup keeper for Vincenzo Fiorillo in 2009 FIFA U-20 World Cup in October 2009 along with Andrea Gasparri.

Personal life
He is the brother Felice Piccolo, footballer and a Juventus youth product.

References

External links
 Football.it Profile 
 FIGC 

Italian footballers
Italy youth international footballers
Torino F.C. players
Juventus F.C. players
S.S. Milazzo players
Association football goalkeepers
Sportspeople from the Province of Naples
1990 births
Living people
Footballers from Campania